Arabdzhabirli Vtoroye is a village in the Goychay Rayon of Azerbaijan. The village forms part of the municipality of Ərəbcəbirli.

References 

Parliament of Azerbaijan

Populated places in Goychay District